Anmol Malhotra (born 29 November 1995) is an Indian cricketer. He made his Twenty20 debut for Punjab in the 2015–16 Syed Mushtaq Ali Trophy on 7 January 2016. He made his List A debut on 5 October 2019, for Punjab in the 2019–20 Vijay Hazare Trophy. He made his first-class debut on 9 December 2019, for Punjab in the 2019–20 Ranji Trophy.

References

External links
 

1995 births
Living people
Indian cricketers
Punjab, India cricketers
Cricketers from Patiala